Segev (lit. greatness, exaltedness) may refer to the following:

People
 Dorry Segev, Israeli-born Marjory K. and Thomas Pozefsky Professor of Surgery at Johns Hopkins University School of Medicine, Professor of Epidemiology at Johns Hopkins Bloomberg School of Public Health, and Associate Vice Chair of the Department of Surgery at Johns Hopkins Hospital
 Inbal Segev, Israeli cellist
 Itay Segev (born 1995), Israeli basketball player
 Gonen Segev, former Israeli politician
 Tom Segev, Israeli historian

 Places
 Atzmon, formerly known as Segev
 Misgav Regional Council, also known as Gush Segev
 Segev Shalom, a Bedouin village in the Negev desert

Hebrew-language surnames